Juan Vicente Campo Elías is one of the 20 municipalities of the state of Trujillo, Venezuela. The municipality occupies an area of 98 km2 with a population of 5,959 inhabitants according to the 2011 census.

Parishes
The municipality consists of the following two parishes:

 Arnoldo Gabaldón
 Campo Elías

References

Municipalities of Trujillo (state)